Malverne is a village in the Town of Hempstead in Nassau County, on Long Island, in New York, United States. The population was 8,514 at the 2010 census.

Geography

History
Malverne was originally settled by the Rockaway Indians at an unknown point in history, with the current Ocean Avenue serving as an Indian path. Western settlements can be dated back to the 1700s, when the Abrams, Bedell and Pearsall families first settled and began farming the area.

Norwood, as it was originally known, formed a movement to become an incorporated village in the early 1920s. This area originally consisted of the communities of North Lynbrook and Malverne Park. It is widely believed that residents of the now Malverne Park area did not wish to become part of the new village and therefore requested not to be included. North Lynbrook was believed to be removed from the borders by then New York Lieutenant Governor Jeremiah Wood, who lived in that area at that time and did not wish to be in an incorporated village.

A vote was taken and voters decided to form an incorporated village by an overwhelming majority.

The spelling of the name was originally Malvern, minus the "e" as in the English connection. When the Long Island Rail Road started service to Malvern they spelled the name Malverne, with the "e". Although Malvern attempted to fix the error, the village changed the name to Malverne, as so many people thought the name was spelled with the "e".  This is a further indication how important rail service was to villages across the country and how powerful their effects were felt upon them. The last farm in Malverne, Crossroads Farm at Grossman's was acquired by Nassau County and continues to operate as the last working farm in the village.

The name was changed from Norwood to Malverne because a Village of Norwood already existed in upstate New York. The name Malverne originates from Malvern, England. Alfred Wagg, the main developers from the Amsterdam Development and Land Corporation, had visited Malvern and liked the name.

Malverne's incorporation was finalized on April 13, 1921; however, it had been acting as a village since October 1920. The village has celebrated the 1921 anniversary at the 25-year, 50-year, and 75-year.

Malverne was originally made up of many different communities (under one incorporated village). The communities were mostly made up of the original farmer of that area and those he sold his land to. While it is no longer viewed the same way, some of the neighborhood names can be found in the street names.

The village's growth has been credited to two major events – the selling of farm land for development and the Long Island Rail Road. The Amsterdam Development Corporation is responsible for the building of many of the homes in the village. Today, there are over 3000 homes in the village.

Today, many of its residents commute to New York City via the two Long Island Rail Road stations in the village – Malverne and Westwood, both located on the West Hempstead Branch.  After a three-year hiatus, weekend train service was restored to the branch in November 2014.

Demographics

2010 census
As of the 2010 census the makeup of the village population was 88.4% White 83% Non-Hispanic White, 3.3% African American, 0.16% Native American, 4.2% Asian, 1.77% from other races, and 1.4% from two or more races. Hispanic or Latino of any race were 8.6% of the population.

2000 census
As of the census of 2000, there were 8,934 people, 3,106 households, and 2,534 families residing in the village. The population density was 8,499.1 people per square mile (3,285.2/km2). There were 3,152 housing units at an average density of 2,998.5 per square mile (1,159.0/km2). The racial makeup of the village was 92.04% White, 1.72% African American, 0.16% Native American, 3.10% Asian, 1.77% from other races, and 1.21% from two or more races. Hispanic or Latino of any race were 6.01% of the population.

There were 3,106 households, out of which 34.1% had children under the age of 18 living with them, 70.2% were married couples living together, 8.5% had a female householder with no husband present, and 18.4% were non-families. 15.2% of all households were made up of individuals, and 8.8% had someone living alone who was 65 years of age or older. The average household size was 2.87 and the average family size was 3.21.

In the village, the population was spread out, with 23.1% under the age of 18, 6.5% from 18 to 24, 26.9% from 25 to 44, 27.8% from 45 to 64, and 15.6% who were 65 years of age or older. The median age was 41 years. For every 100 females, there were 93.5 males. For every 100 females age 18 and over, there were 88.5 males.

The median income for a household in the village was $81,784, and the median income for a family was $87,197. Males had a median income of $53,077 versus $37,743 for females. The per capita income for the village was $31,418. About 1.0% of families and 1.6% of the population were below the poverty line, including 0.7% of those under age 18 and 3.5% of those age 65 or over.

Government
The village is governed by a board of trustees of which the mayor sits as the chair. Each member of the board is elected to a four-year term of office. There is also a village judge that presides over violations of the village code. Elections are scheduled for the third Tuesday of March in odd numbered years.

Some current elected officials are:
Mayor Keith Corbett and 
Village Justice James Frankie.

The mayor appoints a deputy mayor to act in his/her absence. She/he also appoints liaisons and/or commissioners to each department in the village.  The office of mayor was originally called president.

Malverne considered a "full service" municipality with nearly all government services provided by the village itself.  The Village hosts its own Police Department, Volunteer Fire Department (Norwood Hook, Ladder & Hose Company), Volunteer Ambulance Corps, Police Reserve, Department of Public Works, Emergency Management Commission, Public Library, Youth Board, and village television station – MalverneTV.

Safety record
Recent studies have found that Malverne is considered to be one of the safest communities in both the state and country.  A report based on 2012 statistics place the village the second-safest in New York, behind only Briarcliff Manor.

Finances
In 2009, Standard & Poor's gave Malverne an AA+ credit bond rating, one of the highest ratings the financial institution gives out.

Notable people
Jason Michael Brescia – writer and director
Gil Clancy – legendary boxing trainer, commentator and International Boxing Hall of Famer
Tony Danza – actor
Francis T. Purcell – former Nassau County Executive
Ralph Flanagan – big-band leader
Woody Gelman – publisher
Jeffrey Goldberg – author and staff writer for The Atlantic Monthly
Ray Heatherton - stage and TV personality (The Merry Mailman), father of Joey Heatherton
Max Holden – magician
Dan Ingram – radio DJ
Stan MacGovern – comic strip cartoonist (Silly Milly)
Steven McDonald (1957-2017) – NYPD shooting victim, writer and speaker
Ole Olsen – Olsen and Johnson comedy team
Ralph Penza – television journalist
Atoosa Rubenstein – magazine editor
Rudy Rufer – New York Giants baseball shortstop
Frank Scoblete – author
Rick Shutter – drummer
Frank Springer – cartoonist
Charley Steiner – former ESPN sportscaster, current play-by-play voice for Los Angeles Dodgers
Anthony Tommasini (born 1948) – music critic and author
George R. Wodicka – biomedical engineering educator, researcher, entrepreneur, and academic administrator

References

External links

Official website

Hempstead, New York
Villages in New York (state)
Villages in Nassau County, New York
1921 establishments in New York (state)